Michael or Mike Jenkins may refer to:

 Michael Jenkins (diplomat) (1936–2013), British diplomat
 Michael Jenkins (director) (born 1946), Australian writer, producer and director
 Mike Jenkins (poet) (born 1953), Welsh poet and novelist
 Michael Jenkins (sportscaster) (born 1973), Comcast SportsNet
 Michael Jenkins (running back) (born 1976), Canadian Football League
 Mike Jenkins (strongman) (1982–2013), professional strongman competitor
 Michael Jenkins (wide receiver) (born 1982), American football
 Mike Jenkins (American football) (born 1985), cornerback
 Michael Jenkins (basketball) (born 1986), American professional basketball player
 Michael Jenkins (Unification Church), president, Unification Church of America
 Michael A. G. Jenkins, co-creator of the Jenkins–Traub algorithm

See also
 Mick Jenkins (disambiguation)